Karin Amatmoekrim (born 25 December 1976) is a Surinamese writer. She has written five novels and won the 2009 Black Magic Woman Literature Prize for Titus.

Biography 
Karin Amatmoekrim was born on 25 December 1976 in Paramaribo, Suriname. In 1981, she emigrated from Suriname to the Netherlands and grew up in IJmuiden. She attended the Gymnasium in Velsen, and then studied Modern Literature at the University of Amsterdam, graduating with a thesis on "The ethnicity in Literature in Suriname".

In 2004, she published her first novel, Het knipperleven ("The glare of life"), which was enthusiastically received by the press. In 2006, it was followed by Wanneer wij samen zijn ("When we are together"), a novel based on the story of several generations of the Amatmoekrim family. In 2009 appeared the novel Titus. Amatmoekrim has also published short stories in De Groene Amsterdammer and Vrij Nederland. Her PhD-research in modern literature, studying the work and life of Anil Ramdas and his ideas on identity, multiculturalism, populism and the role of the black intellectual in western societies. The dissertation on Ramdas is planned to be published as a biography.

Karin is married to Jesse Smit, the founder of the brand FreshCotton. She has two children, Sumina Smit (15) and Lee Benjamin Smit (10).

Awards
In 2009, she was the first recipient of the Black Magic Woman Literature Prize for her novel Titus.

Selected works 
2004: Het knipperleven (The flash life)
2006: Wanneer wij samen zijn (When we are together)
2009: Titus (Titus)
2011: Het gym (The gymnasium)
2013: De man van veel (The man of many)
2016: Tenzij de vader (Unless the father)

References

External links 
  Karin Amatmoekrim, official website

1976 births
Dutch-language writers
Living people
People from Paramaribo
Surinamese emigrants to the Netherlands
Surinamese novelists
Surinamese people of Chinese descent
Surinamese people of indigenous peoples descent
Surinamese people of Javanese descent
Surinamese women writers
University of Amsterdam alumni
Women novelists